Gamma Centauri, Latinized from γ Centauri, is a binary star system in the southern constellation of Centaurus. It has the proper name Muhlifain, not to be confused with Muliphein, which is γ Canis Majoris; both names derive from the same Arabic root. The system is visible to the naked eye as a single point of light with a combined apparent visual magnitude of +2.17; individually they are third-magnitude stars.

In 2000, the pair had an angular separation of 1.217 arcseconds with a position angle of 351.9°. Their positions have been observed since 1897, which is long enough to estimate an orbital period of 84.5 years and a semimajor axis of 0.93 arcsecond.

The combined stellar classification of the pair is A1IV+; when they are separated out they have individual classes of A1IV and A0IV, suggesting they are A-type subgiant stars in the process of becoming giants. There is a 98% chance that they are co-moving stars.

Etymology

The people of Aranda and Luritja tribe around Hermannsburg, Central Australia named a quadrangular arrangement comprising this star, δ Cen (Ma Wei), δ Cru (Imai) and γ Cru (Gacrux) as Iritjinga ("The Eagle-hawk").

References 

A-type subgiants
Binary stars

Centaurus (constellation)
Centauri, Gamma
BD-48 7597
110304
061932
4819
TIC objects